Luminescence! is an album by pianist Barry Harris recorded in 1967 and released on the Prestige label.

Reception

Allmusic awarded the album 4 stars with its review by Scott Yanow stating, "Everyone is in fine form, particularly Harris and Adams, and the pianist's arrangements perfectly fit (and uplift) the music. Highly recommended to bebop collectors".

Track listing 
All compositions by Barry Harris except as indicated
 "Luminescence" - 6:23  
 "Like This!" - 2:58  
 "Nicaragua" - 8:36  
 "Dance of the Infidels" (Bud Powell) - 5:05  
 "Webb City" (Powell) - 5:58  
 "My Ideal" (Newell Chase, Leo Robin, Richard A. Whiting) - 2:47  
 "Even Steven" - 6:40

Personnel 
Barry Harris - piano
Slide Hampton - trombone
Junior Cook - tenor saxophone
Pepper Adams - baritone saxophone
Bob Cranshaw - bass
Lenny McBrowne - drums

References 

Barry Harris albums
1967 albums
Prestige Records albums
Albums produced by Don Schlitten